Dimitri Kourouniotis (born 1965 in Greece) is a contemporary artist based in San Francisco specializing in abstract paintings. He settled in San Francisco after graduate work in the United Kingdom.

Bold color and energetic gestures typify his artwork.

External links
Dimitri Kourouniotis official site.
 Gallerie Élan: Dimitri Kourouniotis
Fine Arts du Jour: Dimitri Kourouniotis
Oakland Tribune: Art fund-raiser to benefit terminally ill patients

American painters
Greek painters
1965 births
American contemporary painters
Living people